For Her Sake (Swedish: För hennes skull) is a 1930 Swedish comedy film directed by Paul Merzbach. Starring is Gösta Ekman and Inga Tidblad. The film was the first Swedish sound film or "talkie" that was completely recorded in Sweden.

Plot
The young married couple Sigvard and Isabella Löfgren are constantly being sought by different companies where they are trading on the bill. Sigvard is a traveling salesman and Isabella works as a secretary at a theatre agency seeking artists for a revue.

Gunnar Lanner, an artistic son of a fur dealer, goes to the theatre agency's office and tries to demand Isabella for money on her fur coat, as she has not made any payments on it for several months. But when Gunnar signs up in with Isabella, she instead thinks he is seeking a place in the revue, he therefore gets a number and is called in to the theatre managers office.

A little surprised, he sings the song "Isabell" and then wants to receive his money for the coat that Isabella owes him. When the theatre manager hears the story, he thinks it's fun and charming and wants to make a sketch of it all in the revue. Gunnar Lanner soon makes his stage debut, charmed and supported by Isabella.

Cast
 Gösta Ekman as Gunnar Lanner   
Inga Tidblad as Isabella Löfgren, secretary at a theatre agency 
Håkan Westergren as Sigvard Löfgren, Isabellas husband and a traveling salesman
Stina Berg as Mrs. Lanner, Gunnars mother and a fur dealer
Erik "Bullen" Berglund as C.W. Brown, American manager 
Calle Hagman as Carl Hagman, comedian
Albert Ranft as theatre manager of Nya Revyteatern 
Ragnar Arvedson - head of the theatre agency 
Torsten Winge - mind reader 
Ragnar Billberg - Jocke, soccer player 
Ernst Fastbom - doctor 
Sven Jerring - radio host 
Nils Ericson - revue artist

References

External links

1930 films
1930s Swedish-language films
Swedish comedy films
1930 comedy films
Swedish black-and-white films
Films directed by Paul Merzbach
1930s Swedish films